Team Vandergroup is a South African UCI Continental road cycling team. The team was established in 2018 in preparation for the 2019 season.

Team roster

References

Cycling teams established in 2019
UCI Continental Teams (Africa)
Cycling teams based in South Africa